Jezersko is a village and municipality in Kežmarok District in the Prešov Region of north Slovakia.

Geography
The municipality lies at an altitude of 770 metres and covers an area of 7.782 km².
It has a population of about 116 people.

History
In historical records the village was first mentioned in 1611.

Genealogical resources

The records for genealogical research are available at the state archive "Statny Archiv in Levoca, Slovakia"

 Roman Catholic church records (births/marriages/deaths): 1787-1897 (parish B)

See also
 List of municipalities and towns in Slovakia

References

External links
http://obec.jezersko.sk/
Surnames of living people in Jezersko

Villages and municipalities in Kežmarok District